Hugo Mario Noremberg (born 15 May 1962) is a former Argentine footballer.

Noremberg played for several clubs in the Primera División Argentina, beginning with Ferro Carril Oeste where he won the 1984 Nacional Championship and finishing with Estudiantes de La Plata. He also had a spell with Gençlerbirliği S.K. in the Turkish Super Lig.

References

 Mario Noremberg at BDFA.com.ar 
  

1962 births
Living people
People from Oberá
Argentine people of German descent
Argentine footballers
Argentine expatriate footballers
Ferro Carril Oeste footballers
Quilmes Atlético Club footballers
Estudiantes de La Plata footballers
Gençlerbirliği S.K. footballers
Argentine Primera División players
Süper Lig players
Expatriate footballers in Turkey
Association football forwards
Sportspeople from Misiones Province